Skimboarding or skimming is a boardsport in which a skimboard (much like a surfboard but smaller and without fins) is used to glide across the water's surface to meet an incoming breaking wave, and ride it back to shore. There are currently 3 U.S. based competitive organizations including Premier Skim, Skim USA, and the United Skim Tour. Wave-riding skimboarders perform a variety of surface and air maneuvers, at various stages of their ride, out to, and back with, the wave. Some of these are known as "wraps", "big spins", "360 shove-its" and "180s". Unlike surfing, skimboarding begins on the beach by dropping the board onto the thin wash of previous waves. Skimboarders use their momentum to skim out to breaking waves, which they then catch back into shore in a manner similar to surfing.

Another aspect of skimboarding is "flatland," which involves performing tricks derived from skateboarding such as ollies and shove-its on the wash of waves without catching shore breaks. Skimboarding originated in Southern California when Laguna Beach lifeguards wanted to surf the local shore breaks that were too fast and shallow for surfboards. Skimboarding has developed since then to ride waves much like surfing, performing aerial maneuvers and pulling into the barrel of the wave. Professionals have even started getting towed by waverunners into much larger waves.

Skimboard characteristics

Riders typically favor a board length which reaches about their mid-chest height when stood on end.

A  board is capable of sharper turns while sacrificing a little speed. A  board will be able to glide out farther, but turns slightly slower.

Most skimboards will have some nose lift, or rocker. There are three types of rockers generally used for skimboards. There is a constant rocker, which means that the board has a constant curve from nose to tail. Constant rockers are known for better control on bigger waves and steeper slopes.  Another type of rocker and the most commonly used is a hybrid rocker. This means that the board has a curve on the bottom through about three quarters of the board's length, the rest (meaning the flat part) is usually the tail. This type of rocker is good for both speed and control on decent size waves; also the best type of board for flatland tricks. Last of all, a traditional rocker means that the board is almost completely flat except for the nose. A traditional rocker is typically used for east coast conditions where the waves are far out.

Dangers

There are many types of dangers that skimboarders can face on a daily basis.  It is not uncommon to see fractures or dislocations of the lower limbs, some requiring serious medical attention. Lacerations, twisted ankles and bruises are also common, due to impacts with the board itself, or rocks, logs and other obstacles present on beaches. Hamstring injury is also common due to the fast and extreme movement of a skimboarder's legs when they run toward the water and jump on the board. Drowning, as well as shark attacks, amongst skimboarders are not as likely as amongst surfers due to the shallow water in which skimboarding is usually practiced. Even though there are things that might cause these injuries it mostly relies on the conditions of the waters. Places with calm waters and small waves have little to no injury cases. On the other hand like in California, where the most skim-boarders are located, there are rough waters and large rushing waves at their beaches and also many rock structures in the waters. 85% of skimboard injuries have been traced to California beaches. As long as the conditions are right and safe then no injuries should occur, therefore injury can be avoided by the riders choices before skim boarding.

Locations

Many consider the center of skimboarding to be located in Laguna Beach, California where skimboarding became popular in the late 1920s when lifeguards would skim across sand on pieces of wood. Every summer, Victoria Skimboards sponsors a contest called the VIC, which is held at Aliso Beach in Laguna; it is one of the biggest skimboarding competitions in the world. Other Laguna hot spots consist of Tenth Street, West Street, Treasure Island, Thalia Street, and Crescent Bay. In Dewey Beach, Delaware, every year the World Amateur Championships of Skimboarding are held on New Orleans Street. The Florida Pro/Am is held every year in August, on Vilano Beach and Vero Beach, known as the best East Coast skimboarding locations. Also the beaches on Florida's west coast can also provide some quality locations, like Sarasota, Clearwater, Anna Maria Island. Big skimboarding waves are also found in Cabo San Lucas, Mexico. However, people skim in many other locations throughout North America, Europe (the main locations being Portugal, France, Spain, the United Kingdom and the Netherlands), Australia, Asia, Middle East and South America. Some people skim inland because of difficulty with shore access. Flatland skimboarding can be done nearly anywhere: lakes, rivers, creeks, ponds, golf courses, puddles, or even wet grass. In the United States, flatland skim scenes have developed primarily in states not bordering the ocean. Flatland has also developed in British Columbia, Ontario, and along the Great Lakes.

Australia (Melbourne and Parramatta), and Wellington, New Zealand also have dedicated flatland communities and riders. In Europe, the Flatland skim scene is growing fast, with the biggest group of skimboarders situated in Poland. Skimboarding is popular on many beaches where it is impossible to surf, for example, on Boa Viagem, Recife, Brazil, where surfing is banned due to the threat of shark attacks. Beaches that have streams or rivers flowing into the ocean can also make ideal downhill skimming areas.

Israel is one of the only Middle Eastern countries where skimboarding is possible due to steep slopes along its coast and heavy beach break at selected beaches.

Types of skimboards

Wave Riding Skimboards 

Wave riding is the style most popular and best recognized in the sport of skimboarding. There are more athletes and competitions in wave riding than any other division of skimboarding. It is also the hardest and most technical. Today's wave riding boards are a product of years of trials and errors. There isn't much variation in shape because of this. There is a wide variety of beginner to very advanced, high performance boards in this category and it is important to choose the right one for your size, ability and style.
Wave riding skimboarders refer to their board as a "skimboard."  However to inland skimborders it is referred to as a "foamie."

Wave riding skimboards can also perform more advance tricks, for they have the ability to reach deeper water. The waves can act as a ramp in some instances, causing the board and its rider to fly in the air when hit. During a jump or a wave ride, different maneuvers can be made with the board to perform a visually appealing trick. While tricks can be done with all boards, these boards have a different variety of tricks due to its flotation.

The majority of wave riding skimboard manufacturers use a closed cell foam, which is a high density foam material that resists water absorption and dings.  A Fiber-reinforced polymer is commonly used to cover the foam forming a strong outer shell.

Fiberglass boards are great, compared to the wooden board. They are faster, lighter, and they have more control on the water. The fiberglass behaves across the sand and water better, which is important for doing tricks and moves with the skimboard when it hit the wave. Its outer shell is strong, but easy to dent with rocks, shells, like any other composite skimboard.

Carbon fiber boards are lighter, stronger, and stiffer than the fiberglass skimboards and faster on the water and on the wet sand but they are one of the most expensive boards. These boards are more commonly used by professional riders that ride big waves.

There are four essential characteristics specific for riding a variety of waves.  The board must be light enough to practically float (skim) on the water, but heavy enough that it will not fly away in the wind.  It must be fast, as skimboarders need speed to get to the desired wave and not miss it completely.  It must have adequate and appropriate rocker for your desired skimboarding location.  It must be flexible according to personal preference based on riding style and ability.

Flatland or Inland Skimboards 

Inland boards are generally made of wood and are easy to find at a local surf or skate shop, depending on your location. Inland boards tend to be made of wood and have a hpl bottom and, therefore, are called "woodies" by wave-riding skimboarders. Wood core boards are quite rugged, and are meant for grinding rails and doing tricks.  They stand up well against rocks, shells, obstacles, and general wear, and are great for beginners because they are simple to make and low-price. They are also used by a lot of professional skim boarders.

There are two basic sides of the spectrum for board types. The “Trick board,” a board where both sides are symmetrical and the shape is even throughout. This makes it ideal for spinning the board and completing tricks due to its symmetry. The “Cruiser board,” a board where the shape follows the same curves as a surfboard and is either slightly pointed or rounded at the top or tip and the back is slightly rounder. The backside of the board can also have a tail. These boards are typically called pintails.

Industry

The increasing international interest in skim boarding has resulted in the development of a competitive industry, catering for the ever-increasing demand for both quality and cheap skimboards. Companies sponsor riders from around the world. Professional skim boarders represent their sponsor and promote their boards. Companies usually have both amateur and professional teams which are supplied with boards at little cost to no cost. However, companies usually pay for all traveling expenses for their professional riders on competitive tours.

Contests

Skimboarding contests are held to establish ranking amongst skimboarders and provide a way for companies to market products. In North America there are two centralized organizations that hold events: United Skim Tour and Skim USA. There are also a lot of minor competitions such as the Virgin River Classic held in St. George Utah.  In recent years the United Skim Tour (UST) has focused solely on professional competition while Skim USA has gravitated towards amateur competition.  Some events are both Skim USA and UST events, and all Skim USA competitions have a professional division.

In Europe, the European Skimboard League was created in 2009 to promote skimboarding across the world. Its creation has been seen as one of the finest moments in European skimboarding to date. The 2009 League was won by Emanuel (Mega) Embaixador and in 2010 Hugo Santos. The league consists of 4 stages mostly held in the summer months, although UK & Spanish events tend to happen just outside the holiday season. The stages are held in Portugal, France, The UK & Spain, each hosted at one of the best skimboarding locations found anywhere in the world. The UK event is held at Tolcarne Beach in Newquay, Cornwall. Newquay is a location famous for its surfing scene and Tolcarne Beach is known as the UK Wedge to many surfers, bodyboarders & skimboarders.

The DB Dash point Open is a flatland contest that takes place in Federal Way Washington, U.S.A at Dash Point State Park once a yearhttps://dbskimboards.com/articles/2016-db-pro-skimboard-contest. The Dash Point Pro/Am contest has been running for thirteen yearshttps://dbskimboards.com/articles/10th-annual-dash-point-proam. The first contest happened in 2003 and the latest in 2016 where Cody Maurer of Utah won first place in the Pro divisionhttps://www.youtube.com/watch?v=3F8HcymKw3I. Maurer landed a flawless backside 270 big-spin to front board on a launch ramp to double flat bar set-up. This banger helped him win first place.

In the past The Victoria World Championships determined the World Champion of Professional Skimboarding.  The United Skim Tour moved professional skimboarding to a points system in 2012. Most events consist of a set time and date, but, there has been a small movement to start holding waiting period competitions like the Florida Pro/Am held in Vilano Beach, Florida each year, also the DB Pro-AM at Dash Point State Park. The pros all look forward to the first official contest of the year, which until 2013 was held in Cabo San Lucas every spring, but is now held in Brazil.  In 2013, Cabo San Lucas was moved to the second contest of the year.  The Florida Pro/Am is a skimboarding tournament held each August, on Vilano Beach, Florida.  It typically lasts three days, and is the final leg of The Florida Cross Over Tour which includes surfing, skateboarding and skimboarding. The Florida Pro/Am and The Florida Cross-Over Tour are both considered premier skimboarding events. Some well-known skimboarders are Austin Keen, who is the current 2013 UST World Champion, Bill Bryan, Brad Domke, Adrien Raza, Morgan Just, Grady Archbold, James Lovett, Sam Stinnett, Paulo Prietto, Brandon Sears, Brandon Rothe, Jackson Tenney, and Colton Wallace.

Three leading companies are Exile Skimboards, Victoria Skimboards and Zap Skimboards.  There are two types of contests; flatland and wave riding contests.

See also
Inland skimboarding

External links

Premier Skim - California Based Professional and Amateur Skimboard tour
  The United SkimTour - Non-profit professional skimboard tour
  Outdoor Board Sports - Info Guides & Resources on Skimboarding
   SkimOnline - Choosing the Right Type of Skimboard
   BATARDUBREAK - Worldwide Skimboarding Action

 
Boardsports
Water sports
Articles containing video clips